Tierp is a locality and the seat of Tierp Municipality, Uppsala County, Sweden with 6,143 inhabitants in 2018.

Communications
Tierp is connected to Uppsala and Gävle by commuter train Upptåget and the new (2007) section of highway E4 passes just west of Tierp.

Sports
The following sports clubs are located in Tierp:

 Strömsbergs IF
 Tierp City FC
 Tierps IF

Tierp Arena is located here. It is a world class auto racing facility. The main sport at this facility is Drag Racing. It hosts two FIA European Drag Races per year. One in June and the other in August.

Main sights

Tämnarån is a river passing just west of the locality. The Gillberga runestone is located across the river, close to where it is crossed by a wooden pedestrian bridge. Two other runestones, nr 1144 and 1145, are located a couple of miles south of Tierp.

References 

Municipal seats of Uppsala County
Swedish municipal seats
Populated places in Uppsala County
Populated places in Tierp Municipality